Notable people from Portsmouth in Hampshire, England, include:

Sir John Armitt, CBE, FREng, Chairman of the London 2012 Olympic Delivery Authority, grew up in Portsmouth and attended also Portsmouth Northern Grammar School. He graduated in civil engineering from the Portsmouth College of Technology in 1966. 
Hertha Ayrton, scientist and Suffragette who was described as one of Portsmouth's "least known and celebrated figures", was born in Portsea.
Sir Francis Austen, brother of Jane Austen, briefly lived in the area after graduating from Portsmouth Naval Academy 
Actress Emma Barton 
Bollywood actress Geeta Basra, was born and raised in Portsmouth 
Sir Walter Besant, a novelist and historian was born in Portsmouth, writing one novel set exclusively in the town, By Celia's Arbour, A Tale of Portsmouth Town 
Roger Black, Olympic medallist, was also born in Portsmouth and attended the Portsmouth Grammar School, 
Isambard Kingdom Brunel, famed engineer of the Industrial Revolution, was born in Portsmouth
Marc Isambard Brunel, worked for the Royal Navy and invented the world's first production line to mass manufacture pulley blocks for the rigging in Royal Navy vessels.
James Callaghan, British prime minister from 1976 to 1979, was born and raised in Portsmouth.
Frederick Chatterton (1812-1886), English harpist
Mel Croucher founder of the UK videogames industry, born in Portsmouth 19 November 1948.
Sir Barry Cunliffe CBE, one of Britain's leading archaeologists and Emeritus Professor of European Archaeology at Oxford University, grew up in Portsmouth and attended Portsmouth Northern Grammar School. 
Ben Falinski, singer in rock band Ivyrise was born and raised in Portsmouth.
Ian Darke, football and boxing commentator currently working for BT Sport and previously one of Sky Sports' "Big Four" football commentators, was born in the city. 
Charles Dickens, known for such works as A Christmas Carol, Great Expectations, Oliver Twist and A Tale of Two Cities, was born in Pompey
Harry Digweed, footballer
Arthur Conan Doyle, author of the Sherlock Holmes stories, practised as doctor in the city and played in goal for Portsmouth Association Football club, an amateur team not to be confused with the later professional Portsmouth Football Club
Actress Nicola Duffett, best known for her role on Family Affairs 
Helen Duncan, last person to be imprisoned under the 1735 Witchcraft Act in the UK was arrested in Portsmouth.
Michael East, Commonwealth Games gold medal-winning athlete 
Matt Edmondson, Radio 1 and Channel 4 presenter, 
Jill Ellis, two time FIFA World Cup winning coach of the United States Women’s National Soccer Team.
Sir Roger Fry, CBE, Honorary Doctor of Letters and Honorary Fellow of Trinity College, Oxford, is now President of the Council of British International Schools and Founding Chairman of the King's Group of British International Schools. He was born in Portsmouth and educated at the Northern Grammar School and later at the University of London. 
Gerald Flood (21 April 1927 – 12 April 1989), actor of stage and television, was born in Portsmouth. Gerald Flood
Paul Flowers, disgraced chairman of the Co-operative Bank and Labour politician 
Douglas Morey Ford, lawyer and author.
Fantasy author Neil Gaiman grew up in nearby Purbrook and the Portsmouth suburb of Southsea, and in 2013 had a Southsea road named after his novel The Ocean At The End Of The Lane.
Joseph Garrett (YouTuber)
Peter Gautrey, British diplomat
Stephen Goldring (born 1932), first-class cricketer and British Army officer
Rob Hayles, cyclist and Olympic Games medal winner 
Musician and songwriter Simon Heartfield hardcore artist DJ Hixxy, 
William Brodleck Herms, American entomologist and university professor
Journalist and author Christopher Hitchens, was born in the city 
Roger Hodgson of Supertramp, progressive rock band Gentle Giant, 
Amanda Holden, television presenter and actress
Brian Howe, vocalist of Bad Company
Graham Hurley, whose Joe Faraday crime novels are based in the city.
Joe Jackson, musician and singer–songwriter grew up in the city
Audrey Jeans, comedienne and singer.
Mick Jones, founder of Foreigner, was born in Portsmouth
Paul Jones (born Paul Pond, 24 February 1942, in Portsmouth), singer, actor, harmonica player, radio personality and television presenter.
Dillie Keane, songwriter, entertainer, founder of the comedy trio Fascinating Aïda, was born in Southsea 
Jim Al-Khalili is a British theoretical physicist, author and broadcaster. He lives in Southsea in Portsmouth with his wife Julie.
Rudyard Kipling, spent a miserable childhood boarding in Southsea, but prevailed to become a Nobel-winning poet and author of the Jungle Book 
Amanda Lamb TV Presenter and former model
Palaeographer Sir Frederic Madden, born in the city in 1801. 
John Madden, Director of "Shakespeare in Love", "The best exotic Marigold hotel" series,"Mrs Brown" "The Debt" and others, born 1949, in Southsea
George Meredith, grew up in Portsmouth High Street.
Michelle Magorian (born 6 November 1947) is an English author of children's books. She is best known for her first novel, Goodnight Mister Tom.
Alexander St. Lo Malet (1845–1922), first-class cricketer and British Army soldier
Stephen Marcus, actor, born in Portsmouth 
Ant Middleton, presenter of SAS Who Dares Wins, former SBS, current television presenter and author was born in Portsmouth 
Aubrey Morris (born Aubrey Jack Steinberg, in Portsmouth; 1 June 1926– 5 July 2015), actor
Wolfe Morris (born Wolfe Steinberg, in Portsmouth, 5 January 1925 – 21 July 1996), actor
Mason Mount, footballer who plays for Premier League club Chelsea, was born in Portsmouth.
Tony Oakey, former British light-heavyweight boxing champion 
Roland Orzabal, from Tears For Fears grew up in the area. 
Alison Owen, film director, were also both born in the city. 
Alan Pascoe, Olympic medallist, born in the city 
Marcus Patric, actor on Hollyoaks, was born in Portsmouth 
John Pounds, founder of the ragged school, which provided free education to working class children, lived in Portsmouth and set up the country's first ragged school in the city.
Sir Alec Rose, single-handed yachtsman 
Peter Sellers, comedian, actor, and performer was born in Southsea, 
Katy Sexton, former world champion swimmer who won gold in the  backstroke at the 2003 World Aquatics Championships in Barcelona 
Arnold Schwarzenegger, lived and trained in Portsmouth for a short time. 
Nevil Shute, moved to Portsmouth in 1934 when he relocated his aircraft company to the city; his former home stands in the Eastney end of the island of Portsea 
Anthony Thackara (1917-2007), first-class cricketer and Royal Navy officer
William Tucker, trader in human heads, and New Zealand's first art dealer was also born in Portsmouth. 
John Vernon (1922–1994), first-class cricketer and Royal Navy sailor
H. G. Wells, author of The War of the Worlds and The Time Machine, lived in Pompey during the 1880s
Kim Woodburn, of How Clean is Your House?.
Dame Frances Amelia Yates, DBE, British historian was born in Victoria Road in Southsea.

References

 
People